Adam Hendershott (born June 6, 1983) is an American actor.

Biography
Hendershott was born in Los Angeles County, California. He has appeared in a number of film and television roles, including Sydney White and Jack & Bobby, Veronica Mars and Gilmore Girls.

He studied acting with Milton Katselas at the Beverly Hills Playhouse, and is an accomplished photographer.

Filmography

Film

Television

External links

1983 births
Male actors from California
American male child actors
American male film actors
American photographers
American male television actors
American male voice actors
Living people
People from Los Angeles County, California